Francesco Lorenzon (born 3 April 1991) is an Italian football goalkeeper who currently plays for Cuneo.

Appearances on Italian Series 
Serie C1 : 1 app

Total : 1 app

References 
 

Living people
1991 births
Italian footballers
U.S. Alessandria Calcio 1912 players
People from Tortona
Association football goalkeepers
Footballers from Piedmont
Sportspeople from the Province of Alessandria